Raymond Larabie (born 1970) is a Canadian designer of TrueType and OpenType computer fonts. He owns Typodermic Fonts, which distributes both commercially licensed and shareware/freeware fonts.

Biography and career

Larabie was born in Ottawa, Ontario, Canada. He graduated from Sheridan College with a degree in classical animation. He moved to Nagoya, Japan in 2008; he maintains Canadian citizenship.

Beginning in 1996, Larabie distributed his designs over the internet as freeware, operating as his own independent type foundry LarabieFonts. He released much of his Larabie Fonts library into the public domain in 2020 after he determined the designs were no longer of any commercial value. Larabie was employed at Rockstar Canada and had contributed his designs to multiple video game titles, including the hit series' Grand Theft Auto and Max Payne, before he quit the company in 2002 to focus full-time on type design.

Larabie primarily specializes in novelty typefaces that are intended for use in desktop publishing and graphic design. The logo for Grand Theft Auto, for instance, uses Larabie's Pricedown font, which is based on the logo for the international game show The Price Is Right, as well as for the Disney animated series Fillmore!. In addition to game shows, Larabie has also used 1960s and 1970s graphic logos, computer emulation, and other inspirations to design his fonts; most of his designs are display faces not meant for body text. He is particularly known for his “ubiquitous futuristic and sci-fi fonts”; Larabie specialized in that style early in his career because he felt that, other than a few examples such as Bank Gothic, Microgramma and Eurostile, the market for that style was underserved.

Two of his typeface families, Marion and Superclarendon, are released with macOS. Larabie's "Canada 150" is an extended version of his previous font Mesmerize (in turn based on 1920s calligraphic German sans-serifs such as Semplicità and Kabel) with Cyrillic and First Nations alphabets included; it was commissioned by the Government of Canada to be the official typeface for the country's sesquicentennial. The government paid him nothing for the custom work, which he subsequently placed into the public domain.

Larabie has drawn controversy for releasing fonts freely; other professional designers took particular umbrage at Canada 150, stating that the government should have paid for a professionally drawn type since, it was posited, a government has the money to do so. Larabie responded to the criticism by saying "You can’t just throw a couple hundred grand at a problem and that’s the solution for every problem."

Typefaces
Coolvetica—an eccentric neo-grotesque sans-serif based on Chalet and 1970s Helvetica, Larabie's most popular font
Foo—used for Super Mario RPG: Legend of the Seven Stars
Neuropol—a modified version of which was used in the wordmark for the 2006 Winter Olympics
Pricedown
Stereofidelic
Mesmerize
Kawashiro Gothic, Japanese gothic typeface based on the Mesmerize typeface
Canada 1500, based on the Mesmerize typeface; supports Greek, Cyrillic, Vietnamese, and Canadian Aboriginal syllabics

Samples

See also
Open-source Unicode typefaces
List of type designers
Cartier (typeface)

References

External links
Ray Larabie at MobyGames
Typodermic Fonts
Twitter page
Typodermic on MyFonts
Typodermic on Fontspring

1970 births
Living people
Artists from Ottawa
Canadian typographers and type designers
Independent type foundries
Canadian expatriates in Japan
Sheridan College animation program alumni